Muci may refer to:

People
  (born 1958), Italian journalist
 Cosimo Muci (1920–1992), Italian football player
 Ernest Muçi (born 2001), Albanian football player
 Mariana Muci (born 1988), Venezuelan tennis player
 Muci Nano (born 1960) is an Albanian political analyst
 Muçi Zade, Albanian author
 Nikolas Muci (born 2003), Swiss football player

Places
 Muci or Muć, Croatia